The Swift Refrigerator Line (SRL, also known as the Swift Refrigerator Transportation Company) was a private refrigerator car line established around 1875 by Chicago meat packer Gustavus Swift, the founder of Swift and Company.

He experimented by moving dressed (cut) meat using a string of ten boxcars which ran with their doors removed, and made a few test shipments to New York City during the winter months over the Grand Trunk Railway (GTR). The method proved too limited to be practical. 

In 1878, Swift hired engineer Andrew Chase to design a ventilated car that was well-insulated, and positioned the ice in a compartment at the top of the car, allowing the chilled air to flow naturally downward. The meat was packed tightly at the bottom of the car to keep the center of gravity low and to prevent the cargo from shifting.  Chase's design proved to be a practical solution to providing temperature-controlled carriage of dressed meats, and allowed Swift & Company to ship their products all over the United States, and even internationally, and in doing so radically altered the meat business. 
 

Swift's attempts to sell this design to the major railroads were unanimously rebuffed as the companies feared that they would jeopardize their considerable investments in stock cars and animal pens if refrigerated meat transport gained wide acceptance.  In response, Swift financed the initial production run on his own, then — when the American roads refused his business — he contracted with the Grand Trunk Railway (who derived little income from transporting animals "on-the-hoof") to haul them into Michigan and then eastward through Canada.

In 1880 the Peninsular Car Company (subsequently purchased by ACF) delivered to Swift the first of these units, and the Swift Refrigerator Line (SRL) was created.  Within a year the Line’s roster had risen to nearly 200 units, and Swift was transporting an average of 3,000 carcasses a week to Boston.  Competing firms such as Armour and Company quickly followed suit.  By 1920 the SRL owned and operated 7,000 of the ice-cooled rail cars.  The General American Transportation Corporation assumed ownership of the line in 1930.

Swift Refrigerator Transportation Company Roster, 1900–1930:

Source: The Great Yellow Fleet, p. 17.

References
 Swift & Company (1920). The Meat Packing Industry in America.  Swift & Company, Chicago, Illinois.
 White, John H.  (1986).  The Great Yellow Fleet.  Golden West Books, San Marino, CA.  .
 

Refrigerator car lines of the United States
Transport companies established in 1875
JBS S.A. subsidiaries